This list of botanical gardens and arboretums in Hawaii is intended to include all significant botanical gardens and arboretums in the U.S. state of Hawaii.

See also
List of botanical gardens and arboretums in the United States

References 

 
 
Botanical gardens
Botanical gardens
Botanical gardens